The Çamoda Peak, also known as Mount Chamoda, is one of the three peaks of Mount Omurga located near Olympos, Turkey. The peak bounds the Olympos ruins on their north side.  Çamoda's highest point is over 500 meters above sea level.

Çamoda is known for its appearance over Olympos valley, from which it resembles a large rectangular protuberance, and its surrounding orange orchards.

Çamoda has been a popular climbing day trip for tourists in the area and offers great views of Olympos beach, the adjacent ruins, and the valley pensions.

References 

Chamoda
Landforms of Antalya Province